A burn is an injury to flesh caused by heat, electricity, chemicals, light, radiation, or friction.

Burn may also refer to:

Places
Burn, North Yorkshire, a village in England
Burn Manor, Cornwall

People
Amos Burn (1848–1925), English chess player
Harry T. Burn (1895–1977), member of the Tennessee General Assembly
John Burn (disambiguation)
Joshua Harold Burn (1892–1981), English pharmacologist
Richard Burn (1709–1785), English legal writer
Richard Burn (Indologist) (1871–1947), English historian of India
Robert Burn (architect) (1752–1815), Scottish architect, father of William Burn
Robert Burn (classicist) (1829–1904), English classical scholar and archaeologist
Robert Scott Burn (1825–1901), Scottish engineer and author
Rodney Joseph Burn (1899–1984), English artist
William Burn (1789–1870), Scottish architect
William Wallace Allison Burn (1891–1915), New Zealand aviator

Burn Gorman (born 1974), English actor

Arts, entertainment, and media

Films
 Burn!, the English title of Gillo Pontecorvo's 1969 film Queimada
 Burn (1998 film), a film starring David Hayter
 Burn (2012 film), a documentary about Detroit firefighters
 Burn (2019 film), a thriller film starring Tilda Cobham-Hervey

Music
Burn (band), a hardcore band from New York

Albums
Burn (Deep Purple album)
Burn (Melba Moore album)
Burn (Peach album)
Burn (Defiance EP)
Burn (Sister Machine Gun album)
Burn (Fear Factory EP)
Burn (Jo Dee Messina album)
Burn Burn (album)
Burn (Burn EP)
Burn (Havok album)
Burn (Sons of Kemet album)

Songs
"Burn" (Alkaline Trio song), 2006
"Burn" (Deep Purple song), 1974
"Burn" (Ellie Goulding song), 2013
"Burn" (Hamilton song), 2015, written by Lin-Manuel Miranda for the musical Hamilton
"Burn" (Industry song), 2009
"Burn" (Jessica Mauboy song), 2008
"Burn" (Juice Wrld song), 2021
"Burn" (Meek Mill song), 2012
"Burn" (Mobb Deep song), 2001
"Burn" (Ruth Lorenzo song), 2011
"Burn" (Nine Inch Nails song), 1994
"Burn" (Tina Arena song), 1997
"Burn" (Usher song), 2004
"Burn", by Against Me! from Crime as Forgiven By
"Burn", by Apocalyptica from Worlds Collide
"Burn", by Collective Soul from Home
"Burn", by Counterparts (band) from Tragedy Will Find Us
"Burn", by Doctor and the Medics
"Burn", by Dope from Group Therapy
"Burn", by Fear Factory from Remanufacture – Cloning Technology
"Burn", by Five Iron Frenzy from Cheeses...(of Nazareth)
"Burn", by Hamish Anderson, best blues song 2015 Independent Music Awards
"Burn", by In This Moment from Blood
"Burn", by King Diamond from The Eye
"Burn", by The Luchagors from The Luchagors
"Burn!", by Megadeth from Super Collider
"Burn", by Michael Angelo Batio from Hands Without Shadows
"Burn", by Mushroomhead from Savior Sorrow
"Burn", by Neurosis from The Eye of Every Storm
"Burn", by Papa Roach from Time for Annihilation: On the Record & On the Road
"Burn", by Peach from Giving Birth to a Stone
"Burn", by Pet Shop Boys from Super
"Burn", by The Cure from The Crow: Original Motion Picture Soundtrack
"Burn", by The Pretty Reckless from Going to Hell
"Burn", by Rancid from Let's Go
"Burn", by Rob Zombie from Hellbilly Deluxe 2
"Burn", by Sentenced from Frozen
"Burn", by Sevendust from Alpha
"Burn", by Shannon Noll from That's What I'm Talking About
"Burn", by Three Days Grace from Three Days Grace
"Burn", by Toto from Toto XIV
"Burn", by Upon a Burning Body from Southern Hostility
"Burn", by VanVelzen
"Burn", by Year of the Rabbit from Hunted
"Burn: Fumetsu no Face", by B'z
 "Burn", by Android Lust

Television
Burn Notice, an American television series
 C.U. Burn, a cult Irish-language TV comedy series featuring sibling funeral directors and their rundown crematorium

Other uses in arts, entertainment, and media
 Burn (novella), a 2005 novella by James Patrick Kelly
 Burn card, a card discarded from the top of a deck

Other uses
Burn (energy drink), an energy drink among Coca-Cola brands
Burn (landform), type of watercourses so named in Scotland, England, and New Zealand
Burn, Combustion
Burn, slang for a type of insult
Burn, an orbital maneuver
 Burn notice (document), an official statement issued between intelligence agencies stating that an individual or a group is or has become unreliable
 Burn-in, use of hardware early in its life-cycle, intended to improve user satisfaction
Burn-in, or screen burn, on display hardware, damage called phosphor burn-in
Burning, a synonym for optical disc authoring
 Burnup, a measure of how much energy is extracted from a primary nuclear fuel source
Dodging and burning, a type of photographic manipulation
Sunburn, or sun burn

See also

Bern (disambiguation)
Berne (disambiguation)
Burn Burn (disambiguation)
Burned (disambiguation) (includes Burnt)
Burner (disambiguation)
Burning (disambiguation) (includes Burnin')
Burns (disambiguation)
 Burns (surname)

English-language surnames